Marko Podraščanin (born 29 August 1987) is a Serbian volleyball player, member of the Serbia men's national volleyball team and Italian club Itas Trentino, participant of the Olympic Games (Beijing 2008 and London 2012), bronze medallist at the 2010 World Championship, 2011 European Champion, 2019 European Champion, gold medallist at the 2016 World League.

Personal life
On May 25, 2014 married to Milena. On May 5, 2015 his wife gave birth to their daughter, Mila.

Career

National team
On July 19, 2015, Podraščanin was part of the Serbian national team that made it to the final of the World League. Serbia finished silver medallists after losing 0-3 to France in the final.

Sporting achievements

Clubs
 CEV Champions League
  2016/2017 – with Sir Sicoma Colussi Perugia
  2020/2021 – with Itas Trentino

 FIVB Club World Championship
  Brasil 2021 – with Itas Trentino
  Brazil 2022 – with Trentino Itas

 CEV Challenge Cup
  2010/2011 – with Lube Banca Marche Macerata

 National championships
 2005/2006  Serbia and Montenegro Championship, with Vojvodina Novi Sad
 2006/2007  Serbian Championship, with Vojvodina Novi Sad
 2008/2009  Italian SuperCup, with Lube Banca Marche Macerata
 2008/2009  Italian Cup, with, with Lube Banca Marche Macerata
 2011/2012  Italian Championship, with Lube Banca Marche Macerata
 2012/2013  Italian SuperCup, with Cucine Lube Banca Marche Macerata
 2013/2014  Italian Championship, with Cucine Lube Banca Marche Macerata
 2014/2015  Italian SuperCup, with Cucine Lube Banca Marche Treia
 2017/2018  Italian SuperCup, with Sir Safety Conad Perugia
 2017/2018  Italian Cup, with Sir Safety Conad Perugia
 2017/2018  Italian Championship, with Sir Safety Conad Perugia
 2018/2019  Italian Cup, with Sir Safety Conad Perugia
 2019/2020  Italian SuperCup, with Sir Safety Conad Perugia
 2021/2022  Italian SuperCup, with Itas Trentino
 2022/2023  Italian Cup, with Itas Trentino

Individual awards
 2008: FIVB World League – Best Middle Blocker
 2011: CEV European Championship – Best Middle Blocker
 2015: Italian SuperCup – Most Valuable Player
 2017: CEV Champions League – Best Middle Blocker
 2018: CEV Champions League – Best Middle Blocker
 2021: CEV European Championship – Best Middle Blocker
 2022  FIVB Club World Championship – Best Middle Blocker

References

External links
 Player profile at CEV.eu
 Player profile at LegaVolley.it 
 Player profile at WorldofVolley.com
 Player profile at Volleybox.net 

Living people
1987 births
Sportspeople from Novi Sad
Serbian men's volleyball players
European champions for Serbia
Olympic volleyball players of Serbia
Volleyball players at the 2008 Summer Olympics
Volleyball players at the 2012 Summer Olympics
Serbian expatriate sportspeople in Italy
Expatriate volleyball players in Italy